John Stanbury Steward (28 December 1906 – 18 September 1994) was an English biologist and veterinary scientist specialising in mammalogy, chemical pathology and microbiology.

Early life and education
Steward was born in Hereford, England, on 28 December 1906. He was the eldest son of Francis Victor Steward, a veterinary inspector and surgeon, and Elsie Mary Havill. His grandfather was John Alfred Steward , Mayor of Worcester 1898–99 and 1900–01, Chairman of the Worcester Theatre Royal Company, and Director of the Worcester Gas Company.

From 1921 to 1924, Steward attended Hereford Cathedral School, an independent boarding and day school. He attended the Royal Veterinary College from 1924 to 1928, winning the Royal Agricultural Society's silver medal for Cattle Pathology, the Royal Veterinary Medical Association's gold medal, and the Centenary Prize. He gained a diploma in Veterinary Medicine at the University of Edinburgh, which he attended from 1928 to 1929. In 1930, he enrolled at the Liverpool School of Tropical Medicine, University of Liverpool. That same year, he gained a Ministry of Agriculture Research Scholarship in Veterinary Pathology at the University of Cambridge.

Career
Steward was a member of the Colonial Services Club, Cambridge. He was elected a member of the Woolhope Naturalists' Field Club in 1954, and from 1964 to 1965, was president of the Central Veterinary Society.

While studying the infection of horses by strongyle worm in 1932, Steward found it existed in the diseased tendon tissues of the withers of farm colts.

In 1933, Steward was successful in establishing that the worm Onchocerca cervicalis Railliet and Henry is transmitted by C. tuberculosis Mg., and probably by another species of Culicoides. This worm is the principal cause of fistulous withers and poll-evil in horses.

1936 study of the life history of Brucella abortus by Steward revealed that adult forms of the parasite are common in the neck ligament, while embryos are found in the skin of this region. They develop in the midge's body in the course of about 24 to 25 days, and are then capable of infecting horses.

As a member of the Royal Society of Medicine, Steward believed that "the limitations and the great potentialities of veterinary inspection of dairy stock were scarcely appreciated." He proposed to the society in 1944 that, in the interest of puiblic health, more should be done to educated the public by the Ministry of Health and to improve the safety of milk supply by the Ministry of Agriculture.

In 1945, Steward recorded, for the first time in Great Britain, Malignant edema in swine likely due to Clostridium septicum.

In 1951, Steward announced the preliminary results of his application of Gammexane to arthropods of veterinary importance. The results being promising, he concluded that "Among the synthetic insecticides Gammexane is outstanding in acaricidal activity, and this important veterinary use is being investigated further."

Regarding human interactions, Steward proposed the marsh rice rat as a model organism in 1951 to study certain infections to which other rodents used at the time are not susceptible. With Imperial Chemical Industries in 1952, he imported a dozen swamp rats from Florida to test the effectiveness of new drugs. They, he believed, would be more effective then the often used cotton rats "because they are considerably smaller".

In 1955, Steward wrote four articles on Anthelmintic studies for the peer-reviewed scientific journal Parasitology. Each focused on a different approach to chemical testing.

Steward resided in Gwynne House, Hereford and later Inkersall Manor, Bilsthorpe.

Select publications

References 

1906 births
1994 deaths
People from Hereford
Scientists from Worcester, England
Havill family
20th-century British zoologists
British parasitologists
British mammalogists
British bacteriologists
English biochemists
English veterinarians
English pathologists
Chemical pathologists
Imperial Chemical Industries people
Fellows of the Royal College of Veterinary Surgeons
People educated at Hereford Cathedral School
Alumni of the Royal Veterinary College
Alumni of the University of Edinburgh
Alumni of the Liverpool School of Tropical Medicine
Alumni of the University of Cambridge